Oliva tisiphona is a species of sea snail, a marine gastropod mollusk in the family Olividae, the olives.

This is a nomen dubium.

Distribution
This marine species occurs off Martinique.

References

Le genre Oliva Bruguière, 1789, aux Antilles et en Guyane françaises. Description de Oliva lilacea nov. sp. Bulletin de la Société Linnéenne de Bordeaux 41(4) "2013": 437-454, sér. 148, nouvelle série
 Vervaet F.L.J. (2018). The living Olividae species as described by Pierre-Louis Duclos. Vita Malacologica. 17: 1-111

tisiphona
Gastropods described in 1845
Nomina dubia